The 1923–24 season was Real Madrid Club de Fútbol's 22nd season in existence. The club played some friendly matches. They also played in the Campeonato Regional Centro (Central Regional Championship) and the Copa del Rey.

Summary
Real Madrid left the Campo de Ciudad Lineal which they had adopted as their home stadium the previous season and moved to the Estadio Chamartín. The stadium was inaugurated on 17 May 1924 with a 3–2 victory over Newcastle United.

Friendlies

Competitions

Overview

Campeonato Regional Centro

League table

Matches

Copa del Rey

Quarterfinals

Semifinals

Final

Notes

References

Real Madrid
Real Madrid CF seasons